Florentina Costina Iusco, born Marincu (born 8 April 1996 in Deva) is a Romanian track and field athlete who competes in the long jump.

Iusco grew up in Deva, Romania, a city famous for gymnastics. She was interested in sports and as her physique was not suited to gymnastics she focused on athletics instead. Her international debut came at the senior level when she was aged sixteen. At the 2013 European Athletics Indoor Championships she came 17th, failing to go beyond six metres. She came to prominence internationally with a gold medal double in the long jump and triple jump at the 2013 World Youth Championships in Athletics – becoming only the second athlete to achieve that feat, after her compatriot Cristine Spataru.

In her 2014 season, she set a series of personal bests, including  for the long jump, 11.85 seconds for the 100 metres and 7.40 seconds for the 60 metres.

Personal bests
Outdoor
100 metres – 11.85 seconds (2014)
Long jump –  (2019)
Triple jump –  (2013)

Indoor
60 metres – 7.40 seconds (2014)
Long jump –  (2015)
Triple jump –  (2013)

International competitions

References

External links

Living people
1996 births
Romanian female long jumpers
People from Deva, Romania
World Athletics Championships athletes for Romania
European Games competitors for Romania
Athletes (track and field) at the 2019 European Games
Romanian female triple jumpers
Athletes (track and field) at the 2020 Summer Olympics
Olympic athletes of Romania
Universiade bronze medalists in athletics (track and field)
Universiade bronze medalists for Romania
20th-century Romanian women
21st-century Romanian women